The 1977–78 NBA season was the Bulls' 12th season in the NBA.

Draft picks

Roster

Regular season

Season standings

z – clinched division title
y – clinched division title
x – clinched playoff spot

Record vs. opponents

Awards and records
Norm Van Lier, NBA All-Defensive Second Team
Artis Gilmore, NBA All-Defensive Second Team
Artis Gilmore, NBA All-Star Game

References

Chicago Bulls seasons
Chicago
Chicago Bulls
Chicago Bulls